Senath  is a city in Dunklin County, Missouri, United States. The population was 1,767 at the 2010 census.

History
Senath was founded in 1882. It is named after an early settler, Asenath Douglass, who was commonly called Senath and in whose family her Bible-derived name Asenath was pronounced with a long "e" and with stress on the second syllable. A post office called Senath has been in operation since 1881.

Geography
The city lies in the southwestern Bootheel approximately nine miles southwest of Kennett along U.S. Route 412. Senath is served by Missouri supplemental routes A, C and P.

Demographics

2010 census
As of the census of 2010, there were 1,767 people, 661 households, and 433 families living in the city. The racial makeup of the city was 76.74% White, 1.08% Black or African American, 0.17% Native American, 0.11% Asian, 20.71% from other races, and 1.19% from two or more races. Hispanic or Latino of any race were 27.62% of the population.

There were 661 households, of which 37.1% had children under the age of 18 living with them, 48.4% were married couples living together, 11.8% had a female householder with no husband present, 5.3% had a male householder with no wife present, and 34.5% were non-families. 31.0% of all households were made up of individuals, and 17.1% had someone living alone who was 65 years of age or older. The average household size was 2.56 and the average family size was 3.24.

The median age in the city was 37 years. 28.5% of residents were under the age of 18; 7.2% were between the ages of 18 and 24; 23.8% were from 25 to 44; 22.9% were from 45 to 64; and 17.5% were 65 years of age or older. The gender makeup of the city was 46.3% male and 53.7% female.

2000 census
As of the census of 2000, there were 1,650 people, 688 households, and 427 families living in the city. The population density was 865.3 people per square mile (333.5/km). There were 783 housing units at an average density of 410.6 per square mile (158.3/km). The racial makeup of the city was 91.76% White, 0.55% African American, 0.36% Native American, 0.06% Asian, 6.48% from other races, and 0.79% from two or more races. Hispanic or Latino of any race were 11.58% of the population.

There were 688 households, of which 26.3% had children under the age of 18 living with them, 48.0% were married couples living together, 10.9% had a female householder with no husband present, and 37.8% were non-families. Of all households, 34.2% were made up of individuals, and 20.3% had someone living alone who was 65 years of age or older. The average household size was 2.26 and the average family size was 2.89.

Of the city's population, 22.5% were under the age of 18, 7.2% were from 18 to 24, 24.7% were from 25 to 44, 20.8% were from 45 to 64, and 24.8% were 65 years of age or older. The median age was 41 years. For every 100 females, there were 88.4 males. For every 100 females age 18 and over, there were 81.4 males.

Education
Senath-Hornersville C-8 School District operates one elementary school and Senath-Hornersville Sr. High School the middle school is located in Hornersville Mo in the city.

Senath has a public library, a branch of the Dunklin County Library.

Notable people
 Onie Wheeler (1921–1984) – bluegrass/country/rockabilly musician

References

External links

Cities in Dunklin County, Missouri
Cities in Missouri
1882 establishments in Missouri